Mount Kinney, is a  mountain in the Miscinchinka Ranges of the Hart Ranges in the Northern Rocky Mountains.

The mountain is named after Canadian Army Gunner Albert Lloyd Kinney, from Prince George, BC; serving with 2nd Canadian Division, 3 Light A.A. Regiment, Royal Canadian Artillery when he was killed in action 8 August 1944, age 26, during Operation Totalize.  He is buried at Bretteville-Sur-Laize Canadian War Cemetery, grave VI, F, 11.

References 

Northern Interior of British Columbia
One-thousanders of British Columbia
Canadian Rockies
Cariboo Land District